The Palace of Heavenly Purity, or Qianqing Palace (Manchu:; Möllendorff: kiyan cing gung) is a palace in the Forbidden City in Beijing, China. It is the largest of the three halls of the Inner Court (the other two being the Hall of Union and the Palace of Earthly Tranquility), located at the northern end of the Forbidden City. During the Qing dynasty, the palace often served as the Emperor's audience hall, where he held council with the Grand Council.

The Palace of Heavenly Purity is a double-eaved building, and set on a single-level white marble platform. It is connected to the Gate of Heavenly Purity to its south by a raised walkway. In the Ming dynasty, it was the residence of the Emperor. The large space was divided into nine rooms on two levels, with 27 beds. For security, on any one night the Emperor would randomly choose from any of these beds. This continued through the early Qing dynasty. However, when the Yongzheng Emperor ascended the throne, he did not wish to inhabit the palace occupied by his father for 60 years. He and subsequent emperors lived instead at the smaller Hall of Mental Cultivation to the west. The Palace of Heavenly Purity then became the Emperor's audience hall, where he held court, received ministers and emissaries, and held banquets. At the centre of the Palace, set atop an elaborate platform, is a throne and a desk, on which the Emperor wrote notes and signed documents during councils with ministers. A caisson is set into the roof, featuring a coiled dragon.

Above the throne hangs a tablet with a right-to-left script reading zhèng dà guāng míng, penned by the Shunzhi Emperor. This tablet has been translated several ways but the loose transliteral meaning is "let the righteous shine". It is often used as a Chinese idiom, meaning "to be decent, honest and magnanimous," or "to have no secret or do a shameless deed." Beginning with the Yongzheng Emperor, who himself had ascended the throne amid a succession dispute, Qing dynasty emperors had designated their heirs in secret, with one copy of the will hidden behind this tablet and another carried at all times by the Emperor himself.

See also 

 Palace of Earthly Tranquility

References

Forbidden City
Royal residences in China
Ming dynasty architecture
Qing dynasty architecture
Major National Historical and Cultural Sites in Beijing